Mark Craig Bailey is an Australian politician currently serving as the Minister for Transport and Main Roads of Queensland. He has also served as the Labor member for Miller (formerly Yeerongpilly) in the Queensland Legislative Assembly since 2015.

Early life 
Bailey was a high school teacher in history and drama and has worked in transport, gambling, liquor and racing policy for the Queensland state government.

Political career
Bailey was elected to Brisbane City Council in 1994, representing the ward of Moorooka during the Soorley Administration until his resignation in 2003.

Member of Parliament 
At the 2015 election he won the seat of Yeerongpilly from the LNP with a 14.7% swing, making it a safe Labor seat.

He was sworn in as Minister for Main Roads, Road Safety and Ports and Minister for Energy and Water Supply in the Palaszczuk Ministry on 16 February 2015. On 8 December 2015, Biofuels was added to his portfolio.

Ahead of the 2017 election Yeerongpilly was abolished and replaced with the new marginal seat of Miller, which he won with a 2.6% swing.

After the election, he was appointed as Minister for Transport and Main Roads, taking over from Jackie Trad

In July 2017, Bailey stood aside from his ministerial responsibilities following an investigation by the Crime and Corruption Commission into his use of a personal email account to conduct parliamentary business, and his subsequent attempts to delete emails possibly relating to his role as a member of parliament. The commission concluded that Bailey had not engaged in any corrupt conduct and declined to pursue charges against him. He resumed his ministerial duties in September 2017.

At the 2020 election he increased his margin to 13.8%, making Miller a safe Labor seat for the first time.

Personal life
In September 2018, Bailey and fellow MP Meaghan Scanlon confirmed that they had been in a relationship since 2016.

See also
First Palaszczuk Ministry
Second Palaszczuk Ministry
Third Palaszczuk Ministry

References

Year of birth missing (living people)
Living people
Members of the Queensland Legislative Assembly
Australian Labor Party members of the Parliament of Queensland
Labor Left politicians
Queensland local councillors
Australian schoolteachers
21st-century Australian politicians